The 1989–90 NCAA Division I men's basketball season began in November 1989 and ended with the Final Four at McNichols Sports Arena in Denver, Colorado on April 2, 1990. The UNLV Runnin' Rebels won their first NCAA national championship with a 103–73 victory over the Duke Blue Devils.

Season headlines 
 The Associated Press (AP) Poll expanded from a Top 20 to a Top 25 format.
 Lionel Simmons became the first NCAA Division I player to score more than 3,000 points and gather more than 1,100 rebounds. The senior forward from La Salle averaged 26.5 points and 11.1 rebounds to earn National Player of the Year.

Major rule changes 
Beginning in 1989–90, the following rules changes were implemented:

Season outlook

Pre-season polls 
The top 20 from the AP Poll and Coaches Poll during the pre-season.

Regular season

Statistical leaders

Conference standings

Postseason tournaments

NCAA Tournament

Final Four - McNichols Sports Arena, Denver, Colorado

National Invitation Tournament

NIT Semifinals and Final

Award winners

Consensus All-American teams

Major player of the year awards 

 Wooden Award: Lionel Simmons, La Salle
 Naismith Award: Lionel Simmons, La Salle
 Associated Press Player of the Year: Lionel Simmons, La Salle
 UPI Player of the Year: Lionel Simmons, La Salle
 NABC Player of the Year: Lionel Simmons, La Salle
 Oscar Robertson Trophy (USBWA): Lionel Simmons, La Salle
 Adolph Rupp Trophy: Lionel Simmons, La Salle
 Sporting News Player of the Year: Dennis Scott, Georgia Tech

Major freshman of the year awards 
 USBWA National Freshman of the Year: Kenny Anderson, Georgia Tech

Major coach of the year awards 
 Associated Press Coach of the Year: Jim Calhoun, Connecticut
 UPI Coach of the Year: Jim Calhoun, Connecticut
 Henry Iba Award (USBWA): Roy Williams, Kansas
 NABC Coach of the Year: Jud Heathcote, Michigan State
 Naismith College Coach of the Year: Bobby Cremins, Georgia Tech
 CBS/Chevrolet Coach of the Year: Jim Calhoun, Connecticut
 Sporting News Coach of the Year: Jim Calhoun, Connecticut

Other major awards 
 Frances Pomeroy Naismith Award (Best player under 6'0): Greg "Boo" Harvey, St. John's
 Robert V. Geasey Trophy (Top player in Philadelphia Big 5): Lionel Simmons, La Salle (3-time recipient)
 NIT/Haggerty Award (Top player in New York City metro area): Greg "Boo" Harvey, St. John's

Coaching changes 

A number of teams changed coaches during the season and after it ended.

References 

 
NCAA